Marvin Lewis Jones Jr. (born March 12, 1990) is an American football wide receiver for the Jacksonville Jaguars of the National Football League (NFL). He was drafted by the Cincinnati Bengals in the fifth round of the 2012 NFL Draft and has also played for the Detroit Lions. He played college football at California.

High school career
Jones attended Etiwanda High School, in Rancho Cucamonga, California, from 2004 to 2008. As a senior, he had 81 receptions for 1,040 yards and 10 touchdowns, leading the Eagles to a share of the Baseline League championship. He is Etiwanda's all-time leading receiver and was a Super Prep magazine All-American.

College career
Jones attended the University of California, Berkeley from 2008 to 2011. As a senior, he caught 62 passes for 846 yards and three touchdowns for the 7–6 Bears and he was named Honorable Mention All-Pac-12. In his career, Jones started 38 of 43 games, recording 156 receptions for 2,270 yards and 13 touchdowns.

Statistics

Professional career

Cincinnati Bengals

2012

Jones was drafted in the fifth round, 166th overall, by the Cincinnati Bengals in the 2012 NFL Draft. He saw a limited role in the Bengals offense during his rookie season, starting in five of 11 games and catching 18 passes.

2013

In the 2013 season, he had a breakout performance in the team's 49–9 win over the New York Jets in Week 8, catching eight passes for 122 yards and a franchise record four touchdowns. He finished the year with 51 receptions for 712 yards and 10 touchdowns, along with 65 rushing yards. In the 2013 season, his receiving yards and touchdown catches both ranked second on the team.  In the Bengals 27–10 playoff loss against the San Diego Chargers, Jones set a franchise playoff record with 130 receiving yards on eight catches.

2014

Ankle and foot injuries kept Jones out of action for the entire 2014 season. He was due to return to the lineup in Week 5, but he re-injured his ankle in practice the week before and, on October 14, he was placed on Injured Reserve, ending his season.

2015

After missing all of the 2014 season, Jones returned in 2015 and caught 65 passes for 816 yards and four touchdowns. His first score since returning came in Week 2 in a 24–19 victory over the San Diego Chargers, the last team he had played in a meaningful game against (2013–14 playoffs). Four weeks later, Jones set a season-high mark with nine receptions and 95 yards to go along with a touchdown in the Bengals' 34–21 win over the Buffalo Bills.

Jones was held under 40 yards in each of the Bengals' last three games, all without original starting quarterback Andy Dalton. With A. J. McCarron under center, Jones recorded four receptions for 32 yards in Cincinnati's 18–16 Wild Card Round playoff loss to the Pittsburgh Steelers.

Detroit Lions

2016
On March 11, 2016, the Detroit Lions signed Jones to a five-year, $40 million contract. In his first year with the Lions, Jones started 15 games, recording 55 catches for 930 yards and four touchdowns.

2017
On September 18, 2017, against the New York Giants on Monday Night Football, Jones recorded his first touchdown of the season, a 27-yard reception from Matthew Stafford, in the first quarter. He finished the 2017 season with 61 receptions for a career-high 1,101 yards and nine touchdowns.

2018
In 2018, Jones played in nine games before suffering a knee injury in Week 10. He missed the next two games before being placed on injured reserve on November 26, 2018. He finished the season with 35 catches for 508 yards and five touchdowns.

2019
In Week 3 of the 2019 season against the Philadelphia Eagles, Jones caught six passes for 101 yards and one touchdown as the Lions won 27–24. During Week 7 against the Minnesota Vikings, Jones finished the game with 93 receiving yards and four touchdowns as the Lions lost 30–42. Jones became the first Lions player with four touchdown receptions in a game since Cloyce Box did so against the Baltimore Colts in 1950. In Week 9 against the Oakland Raiders, Jones caught eight passes for a season high 126 yards and a touchdown in the 31–24 loss. In Week 11 against the Dallas Cowboys, Jones caught four passes for 43 yards and two touchdowns in the 35–27 loss. On December 10, 2019, he was placed on injured reserve with an ankle injury. He finished the season with 62 catches for 779 yards and nine touchdowns through 13 games and 11 starts.

2020

In Week 8, Jones scored two receiving touchdowns in the 41–21 loss to the Indianapolis Colts. In Week 13, against the Chicago Bears, he had eight receptions for 116 yards and a touchdown in the 34–30 victory.
In Week 15 against the Tennessee Titans, Jones recorded 10 catches for 112 yards and a touchdown 46–25 loss.
In Week 17 against the Minnesota Vikings, Jones recorded 8 catches for 180 yards and 2 touchdowns during the 37–35 loss.

Jacksonville Jaguars
On March 17, 2021, Jones signed a two-year, $12.5 million contract with the Jacksonville Jaguars.

NFL career statistics

Regular season

Postseason

Personal life
Jones is married to Jazmyn Jones. They have six children together, Marvin III, Mareon, Murrell, Mya, Marlo, and Mila. Jones' youngest son, Marlo, died on December 27, 2019, at six months old.

References

External links
Jacksonville Jaguars bio 
California Golden Bears bio

1990 births
Living people
American football wide receivers
California Golden Bears football players
Cincinnati Bengals players
Detroit Lions players
Jacksonville Jaguars players
People from Fontana, California
Players of American football from California
Sportspeople from San Bernardino County, California
American Idol participants
Ed Block Courage Award recipients